The 2001 Jeux de la Francophonie, also known as IVes Jeux de la Francophonie, (French for Francophone Games) were held in Ottawa, Ontario and Gatineau, Quebec, Canada from July 14–24, 2001.

Events

Sports

Cultural

Medal count

Medal table

External links
 Medal winners 2001 at jeux.francophonie.org 
 Medal tables at jeux.francophonie.org 

 
J
Sports competitions in Ottawa
Sport in Gatineau
Jeux de la Francophonie
International sports competitions hosted by Canada
Multi-sport events in Canada
Jeux de la Franc
Jeux de la Franc
July 2001 sports events in Canada
Sports competitions in Quebec
2000s in Ottawa